Contumazá Province is a province of the Cajamarca Region in Peru.

Political division 
The province measures  and is divided into eight districts:

References 
  Instituto Nacional de Estadística e Informática. Banco de Información Digital. Retrieved December 24, 2007.

Provinces of the Cajamarca Region